The 2015 Central New York Classic, apparently a soccer/football event, was the first staging of the early season tournament. The tournament was hosted by Colgate and Syracuse and won by Syracuse.

Participants 

 Colgate (co-host)
 Syracuse (co-host)
 Rutgers
 UC Riverside

Standings 

Tiebreaker

Results

Day 1

Day 2

See also 
 2015 Syracuse Orange men's soccer team
 2015 NCAA Division I men's soccer season

References 

2015 NCAA Division I men's soccer season
Central New York Classic (soccer)
2015 in sports in New York (state)